Soul Embraced is an American Christian melodic death metal band from Little Rock, Arkansas. It was originally a side project for Rocky Gray and David Sroczynski.

History 
Originally a side project of drummer David Sroczynski and William "Rocky" Gray from Shredded Corpse formed in 1997, the band dissolved after creating one song for a metal compilation in 1998. Gray reformed the band with fellow Living Sacrifice member Lance Garvin (drums) and his brother in-law Chad Moore (vocals).

When Gray and Garvin weren't busy with Living Sacrifice, they would hammer away with Charlie T. West at making material for their death metal side project. The band released an EP (The Fleshless EP), and three albums (For the Incomplete, This Is My Blood, Immune) over a five-year span. For the Incomplete was re-released in 2003 by the independent label Blood and Ink Records.

In 2002, the band was part of a sampler for Tarantula Promotions, titled Arachnid Terror Sampler, which featured bands such as Sanctifica, Tortured Conscience, Frosthardr and Frost Like Ashes.

Evanescence's song "Tourniquet" is a cover of the Soul Embraced song "My Tourniquet". From 2003 to 2007, Gray was busy with Evanescence as their drummer as well as his numerous other bands. Gray said in an interview after the release of Immune that the band planned on releasing two to three more albums and in 2006 announced two new band members: Jack Wiese on guitar and Jeff Bowie on bass. In June 2007 Jack Wiese left the band to spend more time on his other projects, and he was replaced by Devin Castle (who is also in Mourningside with Gray, Bowie, and Wiese)

Soul Embraced released Dead Alive in April 2008.

Soul Embraced stated on their Myspace that they "will continue with a new guitarist next year when we get ready to record the new record". After 10 years and three records Soul Embraced parted ways with Solid State Records on amicable terms. Mythos was released on Rottweiler Records.

In 2014, it was announced that former drummer, Lance Garvin, would be rejoining with the new lineup being, Rocky Gray (lead guitar), Chad Moore (vocals), Lance Garvin (Drums), Jon Dunn (bass), and Cody Smith (rhythm guitar). In 2017, the band stated that they have a new album coming soon. The band is working on a new tour and has announced that former Bassist Jeff Bowie has rejoined and pulling double duties with Soul Embraced, and their labelmates Becoming Saints.

Band members 

Timeline

Discography 
EPs
 The Fleshless (1999)

Studio albums

Other songs
 "Truth Solution" originally performed by Living Sacrifice on their album, Reborn.

References

External links 

Soul Embraced on Reverb Nation

American Christian metal musical groups
American death metal musical groups
Christian extreme metal groups
Christian alternative metal groups
Heavy metal musical groups from Arkansas
Musical groups established in 1997
Solid State Records artists
Blood and Ink Records artists
American musical trios
Rottweiler Records artists
Musical groups from Little Rock, Arkansas